Valencia International Piano Competition Prize Iturbi XVII took place in Valencia from September 13–26, 2010. It was won by Russian pianist Andrey Yaroshinsky, who had been awarded the 2nd prize in 2006. Arta Arnicane and Alexey Lebedev were awarded the 2nd and 3rd prizes.

Jury and Results
  Joaquin Soriano (chairman)
  Emilio Baró
  Michel Béroff
  Michel Dalberto
  Elza Kolodin
  Marián Lapšanský
  Kun-Woo Paik
  Fernando Puchol
  Rosa Torres-Pardo
  Tamás Ungár

References

José Iturbi International Piano Competition
September 2010 events in Europe
2010 in Spanish music
History of Valencia